CFLM-FM is a French-language Canadian radio station located in La Tuque, Quebec.

Owned and operated by Radio Haute-Mauricie, it broadcasts on 97.1 MHz with power of 18,230 watts (maximum ERP of 32,000 watts) as a class B station.

The station has an adult contemporary format and identifies itself as CFLM 97.1.

Formerly an affiliate of the Première Chaîne radio network, the station was disaffiliated in 2002. The Canadian Broadcasting Corporation concurrently launched a rebroadcaster of CBF-FM-8 from Trois-Rivières to maintain Première Chaîne service in the region.

The station was originally launched on October 3, 1959 by Radio La Tuque Ltée. It had operated at 1240 kHz with 1,000 watts.

Switch to FM
On May 18, 2012, Radio Haute Mauricie applied to the CRTC to convert CFLM to FM. On September 28, 2012, the CRTC granted the conversion.

In late 2012, CFLM began on-air testing at 97.1 MHz.

References

External links
 CFLM 97.1
 
 97.1 MHz new frequency
 1240 kHz old frequency

Flm
Flm
Flm
La Tuque, Quebec
Radio stations established in 1959
1959 establishments in Quebec